The Austin Poetry Slam (APS) is one of the longest running poetry venues in Texas. Founded in 1994 by Wammo of the Asylum Street Spankers and helmed for 15 years by former Poetry Slam, Inc. president, Mike Henry, Austin Slam is renowned for memorable and often raucous performances by many of the best poets in the slam poetry world.  Austin Slam is best known nationally for hosting the National Poetry Slam (NPS) in 1998, 2006, & 2007, and for Austin teams' national finals stage performances in 1996, 2003, & 2008.

Since its inception, many nationally known poets have been regulars and team members at APS, these include Ernie Cline (writer of Fanboys), Ragan Fox (host of Fox in the City), Big Poppa E, Karyna McGlynn, Susan B.A. Somers-Willett, Danny Strack, Andy Buck, Genevieve Van Cleve, Da'shade Moonbeam, Christopher Michael, Shannon Leigh, Tony Jackson, Christopher Lee, Krissi Reeves, Emily Shafer, Phil West, Sonya Feher, Faylita Hicks, Love Robinson, Peter Nevland, Danny Solis, David Hendler, Zell Miller III, Hilary Thomas, Matthew John Conely, Ruff Draft, The Minister Sin, Erin Livingston, Jacob "Ohio Jake" Rakovan, Jeff & Tonie Knight, and far too many others to list. In addition, touring poets regularly stop by.  Notable featured poets have included Jess Howard, Buddy Wakefield, Derrick C. Brown, Taylor Mali, Mighty Mike McGee, Cristin O'Keefe Aptowicz, Andrea Gibson, and many others.

The Austin Slam has made its home in a variety of venues throughout Austin over the years, including the Electric Lounge, Mojo's Daily Grind, Gaby n Mo's, The Mercury, Ego's Bar, the Scoot Inn, the ND, Progress Coffee and most recently in 2011, The United States Art Authority.  In addition to the weekly show, APS has hosted other readings around Austin, including for the Blanton Art Museum and for SXSW. The slam has also released several compilations of local work throughout the years, including Tina's Fine Ass Lingere, a 2007 team CD, and a 2008 DVD recording of the slam-off at the Long Center.

The Austin Poetry Slam continues every Tuesday at 8pm at the Spider House Ballroom.  The current slammaster is Danny Strack.

History 
 Hosted the 1998, 2006, and 2007 National Poetry Slam

References

External links

Poetry slams
Culture of Austin, Texas